Nebria orsinii is a species of ground beetle in the Nebriinae subfamily that is endemic to Italy.

Subspecies
The species have 3 subspecies all of which can be found in Italy:
Nebria orsinii aprutiana Banninger, 1922
Nebria orsinii comata Ledoux & Roux, 2001
Nebria orsinii orsinii A. Villa & C.B. Villa, 1838

References

External links
Nebria orsinii at Fauna Europaea

orsinii
Beetles described in 1838
Endemic fauna of Italy
Beetles of Europe